Bhanumathi Ramakrishna (1925–2005) was an actress and playback singer in Hindi, Tamil and Telugu cinema. She has sung 118 songs. The following is a complete list of her songs

Telugu songs

Tamil songs

Hindi songs

References

Discographies of Indian artists
Lists of songs recorded by Indian singers